Come from Heaven is the debut studio album by Alpha. It was released on Massive Attack's record label, Melankolic, in 1997. It includes vocal contributions from Martin Barnard, Wendy Stubbs, and Helen White. "Sometime Later" peaked at number 91 on the UK Singles Chart.

Critical reception

Ned Raggett of AllMusic gave the album 3 stars out of 5, describing it as "a gently queasy blend of sounds and styles that manages to be tasteful and downright romantic without being airbrushed soul." He wrote: "When the duo fully stretches its collage/sampling muscles, as on the title track, it can be quite breathtaking, a careful balance between chaos and atmospherics."

Larry Flick of Billboard stated that the album "combines the sample-happy experimental sound of the electronic underground with traditional pop sounds." Randall Roberts of CMJ New Music Monthly called it "slow, deep, sexy nighttime music, so richly recorded and alive with pleasure that only the extremely sexually repressed could not feel it down there."

Track listing

 Samples
"The April Fools" by Percy Faith on My Things
"What the World Needs Now Is Love" by Burt Bacharach on Rain
"My Autumn's Done Come" (uncredited) by Lee Hazlewood on Sometime Later and Somewhere Not Here
"Delaney Takes a Break" by Michel Legrand on Delaney
"Not the Lovin' Kind" by Lee Hazlewood and "Who Needs Forever" by Astrud Gilberto (both uncredited) on Hazeldub
"Plus Fort Que Nous" by Francis Lai and "Summertime" by Memphis Slim on Slim
"A House Is Not a Home" by Ronnie Carroll and "The Ghost's Leavetaking" by Sylvia Plath on Back
"The Hour of Enchantment" by Ron Moody and "The Windmills of Your Mind" by Dusty Springfield on Nyquil
"Courtyard" by Bobbie Gentry on With
"Save the Sunlight" by Herb Alpert and Lani Hall on Firefly

Personnel
Credits adapted from liner notes.

 Corin Dingley – production, photography
 Andy Jenks – production, photography
 Wendy Stubbs – vocals (2, 9, 13)
 Martin Barnard – vocals (3, 4, 8, 12)
 Helen White – vocals (4, 6, 11)
 Donald Skinner – instrumentation on additional loops
 Alex Lee – instrumentation on additional loops
 Angelo Bruschini – instrumentation on additional loops
 Daniel Jones – strings score
 Gavin Wright – strings conducting
 Paul Hicks – strings overdub engineering
 Alex Scannell – strings overdub engineering assistance
 Andy Bradfield – mixing
 Ben Findlay – mixing assistance, additional overdub engineering
 Jacquie Turner – mixing assistance, additional overdub engineering
 Russell Kearney – mixing assistance, additional overdub engineering
 Marco Migliari – mixing assistance
 Justin Griffith – mixing assistance
 Emma Jones – mixing assistance
 Kevin Metcalfe – mastering
 Stephen Male – art direction
 Latifah Cornelius – design
 Jack Webb – photography
 Donald Christie – photography

References

Further reading

External links
 

1997 debut albums
Alpha (band) albums
Melankolic albums